Percival was a hamlet in the Canadian province of Saskatchewan on the Trans-Canada Highway east of Broadview and west of Whitewood. Listed as a designated place by Statistics Canada, the hamlet had a reported population of two in the Canada 2006 Census, down from 15 in 2001.

References 

Willowdale No. 153, Saskatchewan
Hamlets in Saskatchewan
Former designated places in Saskatchewan
Division No. 5, Saskatchewan